Novopoltava is a rural locality (a selo) and the administrative center of Novopoltavsky Selsoviet, Klyuchevsky District, Altai Krai, Russia. The population was 810 as of 2013. There are 9 streets.

Geography 
Novopoltava is located 23 km northeast of Klyuchi (the district's administrative centre) by road. Petrovka is the nearest rural locality.

References 

Rural localities in Klyuchevsky District